Diwakar Krushna Kelkar (Devanagari: दिवाकर कृष्ण केळकर) (1902 – 1973) was a Marathi writer from Maharashtra, India. He wrote short stories, plays, and novels under the name Diwakar Krushna (दिवाकर कृष्ण).

He worked as a lawyer in the city of Hyderabad, which is now in Andhra Pradesh.

Kelkar was a pioneer in composing Marathi short stories which brought out the inner workings of the human mind.

Samadhiwarali Phule (समाधीवरली फुले) and Rupagarvita Ani Itar Goshti (रूपगर्विता आणि इतर गोष्टी) are two compilations of his short stories.

Marathi-language writers
1973 deaths
1902 births